Kristen Juras (née Gustafson; born October 16, 1955) is an American businesswoman, attorney, law professor, and politician serving as the 37th lieutenant governor of Montana. A Republican, Juras was first elected in November 2020 and assumed office on January 4, 2021.

Early life and education 
Born in Conrad, Montana, Juras graduated from Conrad High School in 1973. She earned a Bachelor of Arts from the University of Montana in 1977 and a Juris Doctor from the University of Georgia School of Law in 1982.

Career 
Juras entered private practice in Georgia and Oklahoma City before returning to Montana in 1988. She works as an adjunct law professor at the University of Montana's Alexander Blewett III School of Law. Juras ran for the Montana Supreme Court seat vacated by Patricia O'Brien Cotter in 2016. She advanced to the general election, losing to Dirk Sandefur.

In March 2020, then-Congressman Greg Gianforte, selected Juras as his running mate in the 2020 Montana gubernatorial election. They won their party's nomination in the Republican primary, and faced incumbent Lieutenant Governor Mike Cooney and Montana Representative Casey Schreiner in the November general election. Gianforte and Juras won the election, and were sworn into office on January 4, 2021.

In June 2022, Juras served as acting governor while Gianforte was out of the country, and declared a state of emergency regarding flooding near Red Lodge, Montana.

Personal life 
Juras and her husband John have three sons. Her brother is country musician Wylie Gustafson.

References

Lieutenant Governors of Montana
Living people
Montana Republicans
People from Conrad, Montana
University of Georgia School of Law alumni
University of Montana alumni
Women in Montana politics
1955 births
21st-century American women